The Church of the Holy Trinity is a Grade II* listed church, incorporating Saxon and medieval elements, located in the town of Wolverton, Buckinghamshire, England. The modern church was rebuilt between 1809 and 1815.

History
The Church of the Holy Trinity is the original parish church of the Saxon settlement of Wolverton and overlooks the valley of the Ouse river, near the site of the Norman motte-and-bailey castle.

In the early 19th century the old medieval building was replaced by a new church, begun in 1809 and completed in 1815. The new church incorporates the 14th-century central tower of the old church, but this was re-cased in new masonry.

The new stonework used Warwickshire sandstone, brought in from Attleborough, and was brought to the site by barge on the recently opened Grand Junction Canal.

Next door to the church is a house built in 1729, which later became the vicarage; the front door has stonework from the nearby, demolished manor house of the 16th century, including the de Longueville family coat of arms, and pieces from the earlier church building.

The church was Grade II* listed on 12 June 1953.

Holy Trinity today
The rector is The Revd Gill Barrow-Jones.

Churchyard
Among those buried in the churchyard are the stonemason George Wills, grandfather of the chemist George S. V. Wills.

Sources

External links
Official site Retrieved 8 March 2019
Official history of Holy Trinity Wolverton Retrieved 8 March 2019

Grade II* listed churches in Buckinghamshire
Church of England church buildings in Buckinghamshire
History of Buckinghamshire